The 2022 FC Dallas season was the Major League Soccer club's 27th season and first under new head coach Nico Estévez. FC Dallas continues to use Toyota Stadium as their home stadium and participated in the  U.S. Open Cup tournament after a two-year hiatus due to the COVID-19 pandemic. The regular season started on February 26, 2022 against Toronto FC.

Background

Transfers

In 

|}

Draft picks

Out

Club

Roster 
As of August 30, 2022.

Out on loan

Competitions

Preseason

MLS

Western Conference standings 
Western Conference

Overall standings

Results summary

Results by round

Regular season 
Kickoff times are in CDT (UTC-05) unless shown otherwise

Mid-season exhibitions 
Kickoff times are in CDT (UTC−05) unless shown otherwise

MLS Cup Playoffs

U.S. Open Cup

Statistics

Appearances 
Numbers outside parentheses denote appearances as starter.
Numbers in parentheses denote appearances as substitute.
Players with no appearances are not included in the list.

 Goals and assists 

Player name(s) in italics'' transferred out mid-season.

Disciplinary record

Goalkeeper stats

Kits

See also 
 FC Dallas
 2022 in American soccer
 2022 Major League Soccer season

References

Dallas, FC
Dallas, FC
Dallas, FC
FC Dallas seasons